George Passantino (1922–2004) was an American artist, teacher, and author. He studied under Robert Ward Johnson, Howard Trafton, and Frank J. Reilly. He taught at the Famous Artists School in Westport, Connecticut, at the Art Students League, and at the Silvermine College of Art in New Canaan, Connecticut. He lived in Ridgefield, Connecticut.

Passantino was the author of The Portrait and Figure Painting Book (1979), which has been published in seven languages; Figures in Oil (1980); Portraits in Oil (1980); and Figure Painting Step by Step (2000). He contributed to the book, Six Artists Paint A Portrait, (1974).

His awards include the Charles Noel Flagg prize at the Connecticut Academy of Fine Arts. Passantino's work has been exhibited at the Salmagundi Club, the Wadsworth Atheneum, the National Academy, and many shows.

20th-century American painters
American male painters
21st-century American painters
21st-century American male artists
1922 births
2004 deaths
20th-century American male artists